An indirect election for the position of President of the Hellenic Republic was held by the Hellenic Parliament in April–May 1980.

The ruling New Democracy under Prime Minister Konstantinos Karamanlis possessed only 175 votes in the 300-strong parliament, falling short of the required number for a straightaway election (200 votes in the first two rounds, 180 in the third). Karamanlis, who was aware of PASOK's electoral upswing and the imminence of its coming to power—as indeed happened in the 1981 elections—preferred to move to the presidency of the Republic, which at the time still held considerable powers. He therefore resigned as Prime Minister to stand for the presidency, being succeeded as Prime Minister by Georgios Rallis.

Several candidates were put forward by minor parties alongside Karamanlis, including Georgios Mylonas (KODISO), Leonidas Kyrkos (KKE Interior), Ioannis Zigdis (EDIK), Stelios Papathemelis, Ilias Iliou and Faidon Vegleris (United Democratic Left). Karamanlis received 179 votes and 180 votes in the first and second ballot respectively, and was elected on the third ballot with 183 votes, i.e. the 175 MPs of New Democracy as well as eight independent MPs or MPs from the minor parties.

Overview

References

1980
1980 elections in Greece
1980s in Greek politics
Konstantinos Karamanlis